The Belgian Indoor Athletics Championships  is an annual indoor track and field competition organised by the Royal Belgian Athletics League, which serves as the Belgian national championship for the sport. Typically held over two to three days in February during the Belgian winter, it was first added to the national calendar in 1989, supplementing the main outdoor Belgian Athletics Championships held in the summer since 1889. National championships in relay and combined track and field events are contested separately.

Events
The following athletics events feature as standard on the Belgian Indoor Championships programme:

 Sprint: 60 m, 200 m, 400 m
 Distance track events: 800 m, 1500 m, 3000 m
 Hurdles: 60 m hurdles
 Jumps: long jump, triple jump, high jump, pole vault
 Throws: shot put
 Racewalking: 5000 m (men), 3000 m (women)
 Combined events: heptathlon (men), pentathlon (women)

Editions

Championships records

Women

See also 
 List of Belgian records in athletics

References

External links
 Ligue Belge Francophone d'Athlétisme
 Vlaamse Atletiekliga

 
Athletics competitions in Belgium
National indoor athletics competitions
Recurring sporting events established in 1989
1989 establishments in Belgium
February sporting events
Athletics Indoor